Sontaya Kunplome (born 10 December 1963) is a Thai politician. He was appointed political advisor to Prime Minister Prayut Chan-o-cha in April 2018. Later in September 2018, he was appointed Pattaya Mayor.

Early life and education 
Sontaya is the son of Somchai Khunpluem ("Kamnan Poh") and Satil Khunpluem. He graduated from Assumption College Sriracha and Bachelor of Laws from Sripatum University.

Political careers 
From 2001 to 2002, Sontaya was Minister of Science and Technology, and from 2002 to 2005 Minister of Tourism and Sports under Thaksin Shinawatra. As an executive member of the Thai Rak Thai Party, he has been banned from politics for five years since the Supreme Tribunal dissolved the party in May 2007. Since 2011, he is the chief adviser and de facto leader of the Phalang Chon Party. Sontaya is married to Sukumol Kunplome who has been culture minister in Yingluck Shinawatra's cabinet since 2011. Sontaya took over this position in November 2012.

On 17 April 2018, Prime Minister Prayut Chan-o-cha appointed Sonthaya, leader of the Phalang Chon Party to be Advisor to the Prime Minister in Political Affairs.

On 26 September 2018, Sontaya Khunpluem has appointed Mayor of Pattaya City by Prime Minister Prayut for the benefit of operations in the Eastern Economic Corridor as well as the reform of local government.

References

Sontaya Kunplome
Sontaya Kunplome
Sontaya Kunplome
Sontaya Kunplome
Living people
1963 births
Sontaya Kunplome
Sontaya Kunplome
Sontaya Kunplome
Sontaya Kunplome